The Chosen is an American historical drama television series created, directed and co-written by American filmmaker Dallas Jenkins. It is the first multiseason series about the life and ministry of Jesus of Nazareth. Primarily set in Judaea and Galilee in 1st century, the series revolves around Jesus and the different people who met and followed him. The series stars Jonathan Roumie as Jesus, alongside Shahar Isaac, Elizabeth Tabish, Paras Patel, Noah James, and George H. Xanthis.

Series overview

Episodes

Pilot (2017)

Season 1 (2019)

Season 2 (2021)

Christmas Special (2021)

Season 3 (2022-2023)

References

External links

Lists of American drama television series episodes